Elysium, otherwise known as the Elysian Fields (Ēlýsion pedíon) or Elysian Plains, is a conception of the afterlife that developed over time and was maintained by some Greek religious and philosophical sects and cults. It was initially separated from the Greek underworld--the realm of Hades. Only mortals related to the gods and other heroes could be admitted past the river Styx. Later, the conception of who could enter was expanded to include those chosen by the gods, the righteous, and the heroic. They would remain at the Elysian Fields after death, to live a blessed and happy afterlife, and indulge in whatever enjoyment they had enjoyed in life.

The Elysian Fields were, according to Homer, located on the western edge of the Earth by the stream of Okeanos. In the time of the Greek poet Hesiod, Elysium would also be known as the "Fortunate Isles", or the "Isles (or Islands) of the Blessed", located in the western ocean at the end of the earth. The Isles of the Blessed would be reduced to a single island by the Theban poet Pindar, describing it as having shady parks, with residents indulging in athletic and musical pastimes.

The ruler of Elysium varies from author to author: Pindar and Hesiod name Cronus as the ruler, while the poet Homer in the Odyssey describes fair-haired Rhadamanthus dwelling there. "The Isle of the Blessed" is also featured in the 2nd-century comedic novel A True Story by Lucian of Samosata.

Classical literature
In Homer's Odyssey, Elysium is described as a paradise:

Etymology:
According to Eustathius of Thessalonica the word Elysium (Ἠλύσιον) derives from ἀλυουσας (ἀλύω, to be deeply stirred from joy) or from ἀλύτως, synonymous of ἀφθάρτως (ἄφθαρτος, incorruptible), referring to souls' life in this place. Another suggestion is from ελυθ-, ἔρχομαι (to come).

The Greek poet Hesiod refers to the "Isles of the Blest" in his didactic poem Works and Days. In his book Greek Religion, Walter Burkert notes the connection with the motif of far-off Dilmun: "Thus Achilles is transported to the White Isle and becomes the Ruler of the Black Sea, and Diomedes becomes the divine lord of an Adriatic island".

Writing in the 5th century BCE, Pindar's Odes describes the reward waiting for those living a righteous life:

In Virgil's Aeneid, Aeneas, like Heracles and Odysseus before him, travels to the underworld. Virgil describes those who will travel to Elysium, and those who will travel to Tartarus:

Virgil goes on to describe an encounter in Elysium between Aeneas and his father Anchises. Virgil's Elysium knows perpetual spring and shady groves, with its own sun and lit by its own stars: solemque suum, sua sidera norunt.

In the Greek historian Plutarch's Life of Sertorius, Elysium is described as:

Diodorus, in his first book, suggested that the Elysian fields which were much celebrated in ancient Greek poetry, corresponded to the beautiful plains in the neighborhood of Memphis which contained the tombs of that capital city of Egypt. He further intimated that the Greek prophet Orpheus composed his fables about the afterlife when he traveled to Egypt and saw the customs of the Egyptians regarding the rites of the dead.

Post-classical literature
Elysium as a pagan expression for paradise would eventually pass into usage by early Christian writers.

In Dante's epic The Divine Comedy, Elysium is mentioned as the abode of the blessed in the lower world; mentioned in connection with the meeting of Aeneas with the shade of Anchises in the Elysian Fields.

In the Renaissance, the heroic population of the Elysian Fields tended to outshine its formerly dreary pagan reputation; the Elysian Fields borrowed some of the bright allure of paradise. In Paris, the Champs-Élysées retain their name of the Elysian Fields, first applied in the late 16th century to a formerly rural outlier beyond the formal parterre gardens behind the royal French palace of the Tuileries.

After the Renaissance, an even cheerier Elysium evolved for some poets. Sometimes it is imagined as a place where heroes have continued their interests from their lives. Others suppose it is a location filled with feasting, sport, song; Joy is the "daughter of Elysium" in Friedrich Schiller's ode "To Joy". The poet Heinrich Heine explicitly parodied Schiller's sentiment in referring to the Jewish Sabbath food cholent as the "daughter of Elysium" in his poem "Princess Shabbat". 

Christian and classical attitudes to the afterlife are contrasted by Christopher Marlowe's Doctor Faustus saying, "This word 'damnation' terrifies not me, For I confound hell in elysium."

In Shakespeare's Twelfth Night when Viola says "My brother he is in Elysium" she and Elizabethan audiences understand this as Paradise. In Mozart's The Magic Flute Papageno compares being in Elysium to winning his ideal woman: "Des Lebens als Weiser mich freun, Und wie im Elysium sein."  ("Enjoy life as a wiseman, And feel like I'm in Elysium.")

Miguel de Cervantes' Don Quixote describes Dulcinea del Toboso as "beauty superhuman, since all the impossible and fanciful attributes of beauty which the poets apply to their ladies are verified in her; for her hairs are gold, her forehead Elysian fields".

In John Ford's 1633 tragedy 'Tis Pity She's a Whore Giovanni seals his requited love for his sister Annabella, stating "And I'de not change it for the best to come: A life of pleasure in Elyzium".

Modern influence

The term and concept of Elysium has had influence in modern popular culture; references to Elysium can be found in literature, art, film, and music. Examples include the New Orleans neighborhood of Elysian Fields in Tennessee Williams' A Streetcar Named Desire as the déclassé purgatory where Blanche Dubois lives with Stanley and Stella Kowalski. New Orleans' Elysian Fields also provides the second-act setting of Elmer Rice's The Adding Machine and the musical adaptation Adding Machine (musical). In his poem "Middlesex", John Betjeman describes how a few hedges "Keep alive our lost Elysium – rural Middlesex again". In his poem An Old Haunt, Hugh McFadden sets an Elysian scene in Dublin's St. Stephen's Green park "Very slowly solitude slips round me in St. Stephen's Green. I rest: see pale salmon clouds blossom. I'm back in the fields of Elysium". In Spring and All, William Carlos Williams describes a dying woman's "elysian slobber/upon/the folded handkerchief".

The avenue des Champs-Élysées, the most prestigious avenue in Paris and one of the most famous streets in the world, is French for "Elysian Fields". The nearby Élysée Palace houses the President of the French Republic, for which reason "l'Élysée" frequently appears as a metonym for the French presidency, similar to how "the White House" can metonymically refer to the American presidency. Elysium and Elysian are also used for numerous other names all over the world - examples include Elysian Fields, Hoboken, New Jersey; Elysian Park, Los Angeles; Elysian Valley, Los Angeles, California; Elysian, Minnesota; Elysian Fields, Texas; and the Elysian Clinic in São Paulo, Brazil.

In Siegfried Sassoon's Memoirs of a Fox-Hunting Man, Sassoon writes "The air was Elysian with early summer". Its use in this context could be prolepsis, as the British countryside he is describing would become the burial ground of his dead comrades and heroes from World War I.

Elysium is referenced in the Schiller poem which inspired Beethoven's "Ode to Joy" (9th symphony, 4th movement) - notably in the excerpt used as the European Anthem. Elysium is also referenced in Mozart's opera Die Zauberflöte (The Magic Flute). It is in Act II when Papageno is feeling very melancholy because he does not have a sweetheart or wife and he is drunk singing the song "Ein Mädchen oder Weibchen" (A Girl or a Wife).

The 2012 opera "Dolls of New Albion", written by Paul Shapera, and its sequels, reference Elysium as an afterlife somewhat accessible to the living, though the living in Elysium are hunted by horrid creatures who guard Elysium.

Books

In David Gemmell's Parmennion series (Lion of Macedon and Dark Prince) and his Troy trilogy, his characters refer to Elysium as the "Hall of Heroes". 

In Masami Kurumada's mythologically themed Saint Seiya comic books, the Elysium is the setting of the final chapters of the Hades arc. In it, the Saints, the warriors of Athena's army, traverse the Underworld to defeat its ruler, the ruthless Hades and rescue their kidnapped goddess. The Saints discover that the only way to kill Hades is to destroy his true body, which has rested in Elysium since the ages of myth. The Saints then invade Elysium, which Kurumada depicts as described in Greek mythology, and carry on their mission after a difficult battle with the deity.

In the novel, This Ruler, the story takes place at Elysium Hills High School. It is a reference to the mythology that surrounds American education and in particular high school. It also alludes to the teenagers, in the book, being Greek heroes.

Film and television
For example, Elysium is briefly mentioned in Ridley Scott's film Gladiator, wherein the general Maximus addresses his troops thus: "If you find yourself alone, riding in the green fields with the sun on your face, do not be troubled. For you are in Elysium, and you're already dead!" In Hercules: The Legendary Journeys and its spin-off Xena: Warrior Princess, the actual Elysian Fields appears several times as a happy afterlife, with the families of the title characters dwelling there; Heaven appears as a separate location in the same universe. The name Elysium was used in a Star Trek novel, Before Dishonor, as the name of the fourth moon of Pluto.

The 2013 dystopian film Elysium, starring Matt Damon used the name Elysium to describe the orbital space station of luxury that the rich live on in contrast to the ravaged Earth that the poor live on.

Videogames
Elysium is the name of the setting from the 1997 video game Mega Man Legends and its sequel where its a gigantic space colony that homes the last vestiges of humanity and most of the events of the story either occur or revolve around.

In the 2017 video game Xenoblade Chronicles 2, Elysium is presented as the location in the land of Alrest, shown as a paradise with lush green fields overlooking a small town. In the final chapter of the game, Elysium is revealed to be the name of a space habitat. The characters later discover Earth and name it Elysium.

Elysium appears in the Fate of Atlantis DLC of the 2018 video game, Assassins Creed: Odyssey. In the first part of this DLC, The Fields of Elysium, the misthios travels to Elysium which is ruled by members of the precursor civilisation known as the Isu which were then worshipped as the gods of the Greek pantheon.

In the 2020 video game Hades, Elysium is the third of four levels (known as biomes) that the protagonist, Zagreus, must traverse in his attempts to escape the Underworld. In the game, Elysium is an ethereal realm where Zagreus defeats the spirits of dead warriors, who endlessly fight one another for glory. The exit to Elysium is guarded by a team composed of Theseus, King of Athens, and the Minotaur, known in the game as "Asterius, Bull of Minos," who together serve as the biome's final boss.

In 2021, the video game Honkai Impact 3rd added a roguelike gameplay mode called Elysian Realm. The player follows the character of Raiden Mei as she visits the Realm, known as the underworld where the memories of the last thirteen Flame-Chasers of the Previous Era rest.

Honours
Elysian Beach in Antarctica and Elysium Mons on Mars are named after the Elysian Fields, as is the aforementioned avenue des Champs-Élysées.

See also

 Aaru
 Asphodel Meadows
 Tartarus
 Elysium (Dungeons & Dragons)
 Fólkvangr
 Gimlé
 Heaven
 Locus amoenus
 The Golden Bough (mythology)
 Utopia
 Valinor

References

External links 
 

Conceptions of heaven
Locations in the Greek underworld
Works about coups d'état